Cucurbitacin is a class of biochemical compounds that some plants – notably members of the pumpkin and gourd family, Cucurbitaceae – produce and which function as a defence against herbivores.  Cucurbitacins are chemically classified as triterpenes, formally derived from cucurbitane, a triterpene hydrocarbon – specifically, from the unsaturated variant cucurbit-5-ene, or 19(10→9β)-abeo-10α-lanost-5-ene.  They often occur as glycosides. 

Most cucurbitacins are tetracyclic except some have an extra ring due to formal cyclization between C16 and C24 as in cucurbitacin S and cucurbitacin T.

They and their derivatives have been found in many plant families (including Brassicaceae, Cucurbitaceae, Scrophulariaceae, Begoniaceae, Elaeocarpaceae, Datiscaceae, Desfontainiaceae, Polemoniaceae, Primulaceae, Rubiaceae, Sterculiaceae, Rosaceae, and Thymelaeaceae), in some mushrooms (including Russula and Hebeloma) and even in some marine mollusks.

Cucurbitacins may be a taste deterrent in plants foraged by some animals and in some edible plants preferred by humans, like cucumbers and zucchinis. In laboratory research, cucurbitacins have cytotoxic properties and are under study for their potential biological activity.

Biosynthesis 
The biosynthesis of cucurbitacin C has been described. Zhang et al. (2014) identified nine cucumber genes in the pathway for biosynthesis of cucurbitacin C and elucidated four catalytic steps. These authors also discovered the transcription factors Bl (Bitter leaf) and Bt (Bitter fruit) that regulate this pathway in leaves and fruits, respectively. The Bi gene confers bitterness to the entire plant and is genetically associated with an operon-like gene cluster, similar to the gene cluster involved in thalianol biosynthesis in Arabidopsis. Fruit bitterness requires both Bi and the dominant Bt (Bitter fruit) gene. Nonbitterness of cultivated cucumber fruit is conferred by bt, an allele selected during domestication. Bi is a member of the oxidosqualene cyclase (OSC) gene family. Phylogenetic analysis showed that Bi is the ortholog of cucurbitadienol synthase gene CPQ in squash (Cucurbita pepo)

Variants 
The cucurbitacins include:

Cucurbitacin A 

 Cucurbitacin A found in some species of Cucumis 
 Pentanorcucurbitacin A, or 22-hydroxy-23,24,25,26,27-pentanorcucurbit-5-en-3-one , white powder

Cucurbitacin B

 Cucurbitacin B from Hemsleya endecaphylla (62 mg/72 g) and other plants (e.g. Cucurbita andreana); anti-inflammatory, any-hepatotoxic
 Cucurbitacin B 2-O-glucoside, from Begonia heracleifolia
 23,24-Dihydrocucurbitacin B from Hemsleya endecaphylla, 49 mg/72 g
 23,24-Dihydrocucurbitacin B 2-O-glucoside from roots of Picrorhiza kurrooa
 Deacetoxycucurbitacin B 2-O-glucoside from roots of Picrorhiza kurrooa
 Isocucurbitacin B, from Echinocystis fabacea
 23,24-Dihydroisocucurbitacin B 3-glucoside from Wilbrandia ebracteata
 23,24-Dihydro-3-epi-isocucurbitacin B, from Bryonia verrucosa
 Pentanorcucurbitacin B or 3,7-dioxo-23,24,25,26,27-pentanorcucurbit-5-en-22-oic acid,  white powder

Cucurbitacin C
 Cucurbitacin C, from Cucumis sativus (cucumber)

Cucurbitacin D

 Cucurbitacin D, from Trichosanthes kirilowii and many other plants (e.g. Cucurbita andreana)
 3-Epi-isocucurbitacin D, from species of Physocarpus and Phormium tenax
 22-Deoxocucurbitacin D from Hemsleya endecaphylla, 14 mg/72 g
 23,24-Dihydrocucurbitacin D from Trichosanthes kirilowii also from H. endecaphylla, 80 mg/72 g
 23,24-Dihydro-epi-isocucurbitacin D, from Acanthosicyos horridus
 22-Deoxocucurbitacin D from Wilbrandia ebracteata
 Anhydro-22-deoxo-3-epi-isocucurbitacin D from Ecballium elaterium
 25-O-Acetyl-2-deoxycucurbitacin D (amarinin) from Luffa amara
 2-Deoxycucurbitacin D, from Sloanea zuliaensis

Cucurbitacin E
 Cucurbitacin E (α-Elaterin), from roots of Wilbrandia ebracteata. Strong antifeedant for the flea beetle, inhibits cell adhesion (also in e.g. Cucurbita andreana)
 22,23-Dihydrocucurbitacin E from Hemsleya endecaphylla, 9 mg/72 g, and from roots of Wilbrandia ebracteata
 22,23-Dihydrocucurbitacin E 2-glucoside from roots of Wilbrandia ebracteata
 Isocucurbitacin E, from Cucumis prophetarum
 23,24-Dihydroisocucurbitacin E, from Cucumis prophetarum

Cucurbitacin F
 Cucurbitacin F from Elaeocarpus dolichostylus
 Cucurbitacin F 25-acetate from Helmseya graciliflora
 23,24-Dihydrocucurbitacin F from Helmseya amabilis
 25-Acetoxy-23,24-dihydrocucurbitacin F from Helmseya amabilis (hemslecin A)
 23,24-Dihydrocucurbitacin F glucoside from Helmseya amabilis 
 Cucurbitacin II glucoside from Helmseya amabilis
 Hexanorcucurbitacin F from Elaeocarpus dolichostylus
 Perseapicroside A from Persea mexicana
 Scandenoside R9 from Hemsleya panacis-scandens
 15-Oxo-cucurbitacin F from Cowania mexicana
 15-oxo-23,24-dihydrocucurbitacin F from Cowania mexicana
 Datiscosides B, D, and H, from Datisca glomerata

Cucurbitacin G
 Cucurbitacin G from roots of Wilbrandia ebracteata
 3-Epi-isocucurbitacin G, from roots of Wilbrandia ebracteata

Cucurbitacin H
 Cucurbitacin H, stereoisomer of cucurbitacin G, from roots of Wilbrandia ebracteata

Cucurbitacin I

 Cucurbitacin I (elatericin B) from Hemsleya endecaphylla, 10 mg/72 g, also from Ecballium elaterium Citrullus colocynthis, Cucurbita andreana, deters feeding by flea beetle
 Hexanorcucurbitacin I from Ecballium elaterium
 23,24-Dihydrocucurbitacin I see Cucurbitacin L
 Khekadaengosides D and K from the fruits of Trichosanthes tricuspidata
 11-Deoxocucurbitacin I, from Desfontainia spinosa
 Spinosides A and B, from Desfontainia spinosa
 23,24-dihydro-11-Deoxocucurbitacin I from Desfontainia spinosa

Cucurbitacin J
 Cucurbitacin J from Iberis amara
 Cucurbitacin J 2-O-β-glucopyranoside from Trichosanthes tricuspidata

Cucurbitacin K
 Cucurbitacin K, stereoisomer of cucurbitacin J, from Iberis amara
 Cucurbitacin K 2-O-β-glucopyranoside from Trichosanthes tricuspidata

Cucurbitacin L
 Cucurbitacin L, or 23,24-dihydrocucurbitacin I,
 Brydioside A from Bryonia dioica
 Bryoamaride from Bryonia dioica
 25-O-Acetylbryoamaride from Trichosanthes tricuspidata
 Khekadaengosides A and B from Trichosanthes tricuspidata

Cucurbitacin O
 Cucurbitacin O from Brandegea bigelovii
 Cucurbitacin Q 2-O-glucoside, from Picrorhiza kurrooa
 16-Deoxy-D-16-hexanorcucurbitacin O from Ecballium elaterium
 Deacetylpicracin from Picrorhiza scrophulariaeflora
 Deacetylpicracin 2-O-glucoside from Picrorhiza scrophulariaeflora
 22-Deoxocucurbitacin O from Wilbrandia ebracteata

Cucurbitacin P
 Cucurbitacin P from Brandegea bigelovii
 Picracin from Picrorhiza scrophulariaeflora
 Picracin 2-O-glucoside from Picrorhiza scrophulariaeflora

Cucurbitacin Q

 Cucurbitacin Q from Brandegea bigelovii
 23,24-Dihydrodeacetylpicracin 2-O-glucoside from Picrorhiza kurrooa
 Cucurbitacin Q1 from Cucumis species, actually Cucurbitacin F 25-acetate

Cucurbitacin R
 Cucurbitacin R is actually 23,24-dihydrocucurbitacin D.

Cucurbitacin S
 Cucurbitacin S from Bryonia dioica

Cucurbitacin T
 Cucurbitacin T, from the fruits of Citrullus colocynthis

28/29 Norcucurbitacins

There are several substances that can be seen as deriving from cucurbita-5-ene skeleton by loss of one of the methyl groups (28 or 29) attached to carbon 4; often with the adjacent ring (ring A) becoming aromatic.

Other

Several other cucurbitacins have been found in plants.

Occurrence and bitter taste

Constituents of the colocynth fruit and leaves (Citrullus colocynthis) include cucurbitacins. The 2-O-β-D-glucopyranosides of cucurbitacins K and L can be extracted with ethanol from fruits of Cucurbita pepo cv dayangua. Pentanorcucurbitacins A and B can be extracted with methanol from the stems of Momordica charantia. Cucurbitacins B and I, and derivatives of cucurbitacins B, D and E, can be extracted with methanol from dried tubers of Hemsleya endecaphylla.

Cucurbitacins impart a bitter taste in plant foods such as cucumber, zucchini, melon and pumpkin.

Research and toxicity
Cucurbitacins are under basic research for their biological properties, including toxicity and potential pharmacological uses in development of drugs for inflammation, cancer, cardiovascular diseases, and diabetes, among others.

The toxicity associated with consumption of foods high in cucurbitacins is sometimes referred to as "toxic squash syndrome".  In France in 2018, two women who ate soup made from bitter pumpkins became sick, involving nausea, vomiting, and diarrhea, and had hair loss weeks later. Another French study of poisoning from bitter squash consumption found similar acute illnesses and no deaths. The high concentration of toxin in the plants could result from cross-pollination with wild cucurbitaceae species, or from plant growth stress due to high temperature and drought.

See also 

 Goyaglycoside
 Hemslecin
 Mogroside
 Momordicine
 Momordicoside
 Neomogroside
 Scandenosides R1–R8, R10-R11
 Siamenoside I

References 

Chemistry set index articles
Laxatives
Plant toxins
Steroidal glycosides
Terpenoid glycosides